In algebra, a torsion-free module is a module over a ring such that zero is the only element annihilated by a regular element (non zero-divisor) of the ring. In other words, a module is torsion free if its torsion submodule is reduced to its zero element.

In integral domains the regular elements of the ring are its nonzero elements, so in this case a torsion-free module is one such that zero is the only element annihilated by some non-zero element of the ring. Some authors work only over integral domains and use this condition as the definition of a torsion-free module, but this does not work well over more general rings, for if the ring contains zero-divisors then the only module satisfying this condition is the zero module.

Examples of torsion-free modules

Over a commutative ring R with total quotient ring K, a module M is torsion-free if and only if Tor1(K/R,M) vanishes.  Therefore flat modules, and in particular free and projective modules, are torsion-free, but the converse need not be true. An example of a torsion-free module that is not flat is the ideal (x, y) of the polynomial ring k[x, y] over a field k, interpreted as a module over k[x, y].

Any torsionless module over a domain is a torsion-free module, but the converse is not true, as  Q is a torsion-free Z-module which is not torsionless.

Structure of torsion-free modules

Over a Noetherian integral domain, torsion-free modules are the modules whose only associated prime is zero. More generally, over a Noetherian commutative ring the torsion-free modules are those modules all of whose associated primes are contained in the associated primes of the ring.

Over a Noetherian integrally closed domain, any finitely-generated torsion-free module has a free submodule such that the quotient by it is isomorphic to an ideal of the ring.

Over a Dedekind domain, a finitely-generated module is torsion-free if and only if it is projective, but is in general not free. Any such module is isomorphic to the sum of a finitely-generated free module and an ideal, and the class of the ideal is uniquely determined by the module.

Over a principal ideal domain, finitely-generated modules are torsion-free if and only if they are free.

Torsion-free covers

Over an integral domain, every module M has a torsion-free cover  from a torsion-free module F onto M, with the properties that any other torsion-free module mapping onto M factors through F, and any endomorphism of F over M is an automorphism of F. Such a torsion-free cover of M is unique up to isomorphism. Torsion-free covers are closely related to flat covers.

Torsion-free quasicoherent sheaves
A quasicoherent sheaf F over a scheme X is a sheaf of -modules such that for any open affine subscheme U = Spec(R) the restriction F|U is associated to some module M over R. The sheaf F is said to be torsion-free if all those modules M are torsion-free over their respective rings. Alternatively, F is torsion-free if and only if it has no local torsion sections.

See also
Torsion (algebra)
torsion-free abelian group
torsion-free abelian group of rank 1; the classification theory exists for this class.

References

Ring theory